The Waiting Soul is a 1917 American silent drama film directed by Burton L. King and starring Olga Petrova, Mahlon Hamilton and Mathilde Brundage.

Cast
 Olga Petrova as Grace Vaughan 
 Mahlon Hamilton as Stuart Brinsley 
 Mathilde Brundage as Mrs. Brinsley 
 Wyndham Standing as Dudley Kent 
 Lettie Ford as Mrs. Hargrove 
 Anna Laughney as Marie D'Arcy 
 Roy Pilcher as Willard Ashbrook 
 Wilfred De Shields as John Hargrove

References

Bibliography
 Lowe, Denise. An Encyclopedic Dictionary of Women in Early American Films: 1895-1930. Routledge, 2014.

External links
 

1917 films
1917 drama films
1910s English-language films
American silent feature films
Silent American drama films
American black-and-white films
Films directed by Burton L. King
Metro Pictures films
1910s American films